Robert Ashforth (born ) is a retired professional rugby player, he had three Cambridge rugby blues, and was an England Rugby player at U16, U18, Colts & Students.  He was educated at Bradford Grammar School and Cambridge University. He played for London Irish to the end of the 2001 season, having previously been at Bedford Blues. He has three children.

References 

1976 births
Living people
Bedford Blues players
English rugby union players
London Irish players